Sir Henry Bagenal PC (c. 1556 – 14 August 1598) was marshal of the Royal Irish Army during the reign of Queen Elizabeth I.

Life

He was the eldest son of Nicholas Bagenal and Eleanor Griffith, daughter of Sir Edward Griffith of Penrhyn. His brother was Dudley Bagenal. Bagenal probably matriculated from Jesus College, Oxford when he was 16 (in 1572 or 1573), but left without taking a degree in order to join his father Sir Nicholas who was then marshal of the army in Ireland. In May 1577, Sir Nicholas was appointed chief commissioner of Ulster, with Henry as his assistant. Bagenal was himself knighted in 1578. He was involved in some military disasters, such as a defeat at Glenmalure on 25 August 1580 when Lord Grey led the troops (with Bagenal one of the commanders of the rear) into battle with Fiach McHugh O'Byrne and Viscount Baltinglass in the Wicklow mountain passes. In 1584, Bagenal was colonel of the garrison at Carrickfergus when 1,300 of Sorley Boy MacDonnell's Scots landed on Rathlin Island. Bagenal attacked but was ambushed at Glenarm and had to retreat.

In May 1586, Bagenal was sent by his father to the court to report. He sought measures to weaken Hugh O'Neill, 2nd Earl of Tyrone, an enhancement of the role of the marshal, and a presidency in Ulster with a shire hall and jail to dispense royal justice. Whilst on his visit, he wrote to Edward Manners, 3rd Earl of Rutland (a relative of his wife) on 16 September 1586 to ask whether he had a parliamentary borough to spare; he was elected MP for both Grantham and Anglesey and chose the latter. He returned to Ireland in September 1587 to deputize for his father. He succeeded his father as marshal of the army in Ireland and chief commissioner for Ulster in October 1590, and was sworn of the Privy Council. His proposals for action were not accepted, as a decision had been taken to adopt a conciliatory attempt to O'Neill. To Bagenal's contempt, O'Neill asked for the hand of Bagenal's sister Mabel in marriage; he refused, but they eloped anyway.

In May 1595, Bagenal led an army of 1,750 to relieve the garrison at Monaghan. His forces were attacked by O'Neill and sustained heavy losses. Bagenal was forced to withdraw to Newry and had to be resupplied by sea as O'Neill had blocked the Moyry Pass. Bagenal managed to resupply the Armagh garrison in December 1598 and June 1597, but had more difficulty in resupplying a fort on the Blackwater  In an attempt to do so, he was mortally wounded by O'Neill's forces during Battle of the Yellow Ford.

Family
He married Eleanor Savage, daughter of Sir John Savage and Elizabeth Manners, daughter of Thomas Manners, 1st Earl of Rutland. They had three sons and six daughters. The senior Bagenal line died out in 1712 with the death of Nicholas Bagenal; the junior but better-known branch in Carlow, who founded Bagenalstown, survived longer.

Legacy
Brian Friel's play Making History turns largely on the marriage between Henry's sister Mabel and Hugh O'Neill. Mabel and another sister, Mary Barnewall, are major characters in the play. Henry himself is mentioned often but does not appear on stage.

References

Sources

1550s births
1598 deaths
Alumni of Jesus College, Oxford
English army officers
English MPs 1586–1587
English knights
Members of the Parliament of England (pre-1707) for constituencies in Wales
16th-century English soldiers
People of the Nine Years' War (Ireland)
English military personnel killed in action